Martainville may refer to the communes in France:

Martainville, Calvados
Martainville, Eure 
Martainville-Épreville